Abu Hatim, Muhammad ibn Idris al-Razi (811–890) was a notable hadith scholar and Athari theologian born in Ray. He is the father of Ibn Abi Hatim.

Life
His full name is Abū Ḥātim Muḥammad ibn Idrīs ibn al-Mundhir ibn Dāwūd ibn Mihrān al-Rāzī al-Ḥanẓalī al-Ghaṭafānī. Some sources suggest that he was originally from Isfahan and was a mawla of the Ghatafan tribe. Other sources suggest that he acquired his nisbat from a street of Ray called "Darb Ḥanẓalah". He died on the month of Sha’bân in the year 277H/11-12.890 CE.

His teachers of Hadith 
The better known [narrators] he narrated from:
He narrated from many, such that al-Khalili said, “Abu Hatim al-Labban al-Ḥāfiẓ said to me, ‘I had gathered [those] who Abu Hatim ar-Razi narrated from; they reached close to 3,000.’”

From the better known of them are:
Abū Nuʿaym al-Faḍl ibn Dukayn
Zuhayr ibn ʿAbbād
Yaḥyá ibn Bukayr
ʿUbayd Allāh ibn Mūsá
Ādam ibn Abī Iyās
`Abd Allāh ibn Ṣāliḥ al-ʿIjlī
ʿAbd Allāh ibn Ṣāliḥ al-Kātib
Muḥammad ibn ʿAbd Allāh al-Anṣārī
Qabīṣah

Some of his early students 
The better known narrators [who narrated] from him:
Abū Zurʿah al-Rāzī
Yūnus ibn ʿAbd al-Aʿlá
Abū Bakr ibn Abī al-Dunyā
Mūsá ibn Isḥāq al-Anṣārī
Abū Dāwūd
Al-Nasāʾī
Abū ʿAwānah al-Isfarāʾinī
Abū al-Ḥasan al-Qaṭṭān
Abū Bishr al-Dūlābī

Praise 
The Scholars’ and Imams’ commendation of him:
Abū Zur’ah told Abū Ḥātim, “I have not seen [anyone] more intent on seeking the hadîth than you.”
Yūnus ibn ʿAbd al-Aʿlá said, “Abu Zur’ah and Abū Hâtim are the two Imams of Khurasan.” He supplicated for them both and said, “Their continuance is an improvement for the Muslims.”
ʿAbd al-Raḥmān ibn Abī Ḥātim said, “I heard Mūsâ bin Is·hâq al-Qâdî saying, ‘I have not seen [anyone] who memorized more hadith than your father,’ and he had met Abū Bakr Ibn Abi Shaybah, Ibn Numayr, Yahya ibn Ma'in, and Yahya al-Himmani.”
Ahmad ibn Salamah an-Naisâbūrî said, “I have not seen after Ishaq and Muhammad ibn Yahya [anyone] more preserving of the hadîth or more knowledgeable of its meanings than Abi Hatim ar-Razi.”
Uthman ibn Khurrazad said, “The most preserving of those I saw are four: Muhammad ibn al-Minhal ad-Darir, Ibrâhîm ibn ‘Ar’arah, Abu Zur’ah ar-Razi, and Abu Hatim.”
Al-Khalili said, Abū Hâtim was a scholar of the Companions’ differences [of opinion] and the jurisprudence of the Followers and [those] after them. I heard my grandfather and a group [who] heard ‘Ali ibn Ibrahim al-Qattan saying, “I have not seen the like of Abu Hatim.” So we told him, “[But] you had seen Ibrâhîm al-Harbî and Isma’il al-Qadi.” He said, “I have not seen [anyone] more complete or more virtuous than Abu Hatim.”
Abu al-Qasim al-Lalaka’i said, “Abū Hâtim was an imam, a ḥāfiẓ, a verifier.”
Al-Khatib al-Baghdadi said, “Abū Hâtim was one of the credible, ḥāfiẓ imams.”
Al-Dhahabi said, “He was among the oceans of knowledge. He travelled about the countries and excelled in the text and the chain [of transmission]. He gathered and compiled, disparaged and accredited, authenticated and deemed defective.” He said, “He was one of the notables and from the formidable imams of the People of the Relic … he was a neighbour in the arena of his comrade and relative, the ḥāfiẓ Abu Zur’ah.” 

Jonathan A. C. Brown identifies him as one of the three most important hadith critics of his generation, alongside al-Bukhārī and Abū Zurʿah al-Rāzī (Hadith, 81).

References

Hadith scholars
Sunni imams
Atharis
811 births
890 deaths
People from Ray, Iran